The interacting boson model (IBM) is a model in nuclear physics in which
nucleons (protons or neutrons) pair up, essentially
acting as a single particle with boson properties, with
integral spin of 0, 2 or 4.

It is sometimes known as the Interacting boson approximation (IBA).

The IBM1/IBM-I model treats both types of nucleons the same and considers only pairs of nucleons coupled to
total angular momentum 0 and 2, called respectively, s and d bosons. 

The IBM2/IBM-II model treats protons and neutrons separately.

Both models are restricted to nuclei with even numbers of protons and neutrons.

The model can be used to predict vibrational and rotational modes of non-spherical nuclei.

History
This model was invented by Akito Arima and Francesco Iachello in 1974. while working at the Kernfysisch Versneller Instituut(KVI) in Groningen, Netherlands. KVI is now property of Universitair Medisch Centrum Groningen (https://umcgresearch.org/).

See also
Liquid drop model
Nuclear shell model

References

Further reading
 Evolution of shapes in even–even nuclei using the standard interacting boson model

Nuclear physics